Eschscholzia palmeri is a species of poppy native to Guadalupe Island in Mexico. It is a low growing woody perennial with a narrow taproot and yellow flowers.

References

External links
Photo gallery

palmeri
Flora of Baja California
Flora of Mexican Pacific Islands
Endemic flora of Mexico
Natural history of the California chaparral and woodlands